Events from the year 1851 in Scotland.

Incumbents

Law officers 
 Lord Advocate – Andrew Rutherfurd until April; then James Moncreiff
 Solicitor General for Scotland – James Moncreiff; then John Cowan; then George Deas

Judiciary 
 Lord President of the Court of Session and Lord Justice General – Lord Boyle
 Lord Justice Clerk – Lord Glencorse

Events 
 9 March – Robert Eden is consecrated as first Bishop of Moray and Ross in the Scottish Episcopal Church, an office he will hold until his death in 1886.
 15 March – Explosion at Victoria Pit colliery, Nitshill kills 61 men and boys.
 30/31 March – United Kingdom Census: Scotland's population is recorded as 2.89 million; about 7% are of Irish birth.
 Cathedral of the Isles opened in Millport, Cumbrae, within the Episcopal Church's Diocese of Argyll and The Isles.
 Donaldson's Hospital opens in Edinburgh, primarily for the education of deaf children.
 Hebrides shipping services of Burns Brothers pass to David and Alexander Hutcheson and David MacBrayne as David Hutcheson & Co.
 Bell's whisky is first blended.
 St Leonard's Mill damask linen weaving factory established at Dunfermline by Erskine Beveridge.
 Publication of Daniel Wilson's The Archaeology and Prehistoric Annals of Scotland, which introduces the word prehistoric into the English archaeological vocabulary.
 James Valentine (photographer) establishes the printing business of Valentine & Sons in Dundee.

Births 
 March – James Lang, footballer
 20 April – Young Tom Morris, golfer, youngest winner of The Open Championship (died 1875)
 1 August – Daniel Macaulay Stevenson, shipbroker, Liberal politician and philanthropist (died 1944)
 11 October – Lord Douglas Gordon, Liberal MP (died 1888)
 30 October – George Lennox Watson, naval architect (died 1904)
 27 December – Erskine Beveridge, textile manufacturer and antiquarian (died 1920)
 James Johnston, missionary (died 1921 in Jamaica)

Deaths 
 6 July – David Macbeth Moir, physician and writer (born 1798)
 20 October – Patrick Sellar, lawyer, factor and sheep farmer instrumental in the Highland Clearances (born 1780)
 7 December – Sir John Gladstone, 1st Baronet, merchant (born 1764)

The arts
 c. June – English artist Sir Edwin Landseer's painting of a Scottish stag, The Monarch of the Glen, is first exhibited, at the Royal Academy Summer Exhibition in London.

See also 
 Timeline of Scottish history
 1851 in the United Kingdom

References 

 
Years of the 19th century in Scotland
Scotland
1850s in Scotland